The men's 100 metres event at the 2017 European Athletics U23 Championships was held in Bydgoszcz, Poland, at Zdzisław Krzyszkowiak Stadium on 13 and 14 July.

Medalists

Records
Prior to the competition, the records were as follows:

Results

Heats
13 July

Qualification rule: First 3 (Q) and the next 6 fastest (q) qualified for the semifinals.

Wind:Heat 1: +0.9 m/s, Heat 2: +1.2 m/s, Heat 3: +0.5 m/s, Heat 4: +1.0 m/s, Heat 5: +1.5 m/s, Heat 6: +1.0 m/s

Semifinals
13 July

Qualification rule: First 2 (Q) and the next 2 fastest (q) qualified for the final.

Wind:Heat 1:  +1.6 m/s, Heat 2: +0.8 m/s, Heat 3: +1.5 m/s

Final
14 July

Wind: 0.0 m/s

References

100 metres
100 metres at the European Athletics U23 Championships